The 1968–69 season was Stoke City's 62nd season in the Football League and the 38th in the First Division.

Stoke failed to improve on last season's near miss and again were involved in a relegation scrap. Stoke won just nine matches all season and scored just 40 goals as they narrowly avoided relegation by three points.

Season review

League
To address last season's lack of goals Waddington brought in Scottish international David Herd on a free transfer from Manchester United. There was tragedy in October 1968 as reserve team goalkeeper Paul Shardlow suffered a heart attack in a training match and died.

As the 1968–69 season began, once again Stoke found goals hard to come by, they only scored eight in their opening eleven league matches and although the feeling amongst the supporters was that the team was too good to be relegated they were lucky in the fact that Queens Park Rangers and Leicester City had poor seasons. Stoke could only manage 19th place in a very uneventful season which saw champions Leeds United gain revenge for last season by beating Stoke 5–1 at the Victoria Ground. It had been a nerve-racking season with Stoke seemingly involved in a relegation battle from the start, and thanks to some determined performances Stoke scrambled three points clear of the drop zone. The 1968–69 season did, however mark the debut of Denis Smith who was later to become club captain and would have a major impact on the club's fortunes during the 1970s.

At the end of the season in May 1969 Stoke City embarked on an end of season tour which saw them play against Congo Kinshasa (drew 1–1) and then on to Spain where they played against Catalonia giants Barcelona. The match was played in front of 65,000 at the Camp Nou and Stoke shocked the prestigious hosts with a 3–2 victory. David Herd scored twice and Harry Burrows hit a third to put Stoke into a 3–0 lead at half-time. Barcelona fought back scoring twice through Carles Rexach and Pedro Zabalza but a  Stoke held on for a splendid victory.

FA Cup
After unspectacular wins over Fourth Division sides York City and Halifax Town, Stoke lost 3–2 away at Chelsea.

League Cup
Blackburn Rovers eliminated Stoke in a second round replay 1–0 after a 1–1 draw at Ewood Park, John Mahoney scoring for the "Potters".

Final league table

Results

Stoke's score comes first

Legend

Football League First Division

FA Cup

League Cup

Friendlies

Squad statistics

References

Stoke City F.C. seasons
Stoke